Mohammedreza Eslamloo (محمدرضا‌ اسالملو‌) (born 1947, in Shiraz) graduated in Television and Film from the College of Communications of the University of Texas. He worked for the construction jihad unit and Islamic combatants department at IRIB and Art Institute. He taught at the School of Television 

Famous for his political pro-Khomeini documentaries, he always refuses to become the official artist of the regime and continues to question the political power.

Eslamloo made a docudrama on the event of September 11: “The 9/11 Black Box”  The main actor of this political movie received the Special Award for Human Rights at 29th Fajr Film Festival (2011). This film represented Iran at the 64th Cannes Film Festival (May 2011)

Major short films
 [Hodood-e Tarikh] "The Limits of History" (cinematographer, 1982)
 [Abadan Shahr-e Mazloom] "Abadan, the City that Suffered" (+ cinematographer and editor, 1982)
 [Bar Faraz-e Fav] "Over Fav" (+ writer, director of photography, and editor, 1982)
 [Az Kheibar ta Karbala] "From Kheibar to Karbala (+ cinematographer and editor, 1987)
 [Emrooz Felestin, Choobha-ye Khoshk] "Palestine Today, Dry Pieces of Wood" (+ editor and assistant cinematographer, 1988)

Major films
 The Passage (1986)
 Fright (1987)
 Seyyed's Garden (1989)
 [Mosalmanan] "Moslems" (1994)
 [Mosalmanan] "Moslems" (second series, 1995)
 The 9/11 Black Box (2011)

References

Iranian film directors
1947 births
Living people